Caldwellia philyrina was an extinct species of minute, air-breathing land snails, terrestrial pulmonate gastropod mollusks or micromollusks in the family Euconulidae, the hive snails. This species was endemic to Mauritius.

References

Caldwellia
Extinct gastropods
Gastropods described in 1851
Taxonomy articles created by Polbot